Estrogen sulfotransferase is an enzyme that in humans is encoded by the SULT1E1 gene.

Sulfotransferase enzymes catalyze the sulfate conjugation of many hormones, neurotransmitters, drugs, and xenobiotic compounds. These cytosolic enzymes are different in their tissue distributions and substrate specificities. The gene structure (number and length of exons) is similar among family members. This gene encodes a protein that transfers a sulfo moiety to and from estrone, which may control levels of estrogen receptors.

See also
 Steroidogenic enzyme
 Steroid sulfotransferase
 Estrone sulfotransferase
 Steroid sulfatase

References

Further reading